Jordi Arrese and Andrew Kratzmann were the defending champions but did not compete that year.

Pablo Albano and Lucas Arnold won in the final 6–1, 6–3 against Mariano Hood and Sebastián Prieto.

Seeds
Champion seeds are indicated in bold text while text in italics indicates the round in which those seeds were eliminated.

 Libor Pimek /  Byron Talbot (semifinals)
 Jiří Novák /  David Rikl (quarterfinals)
 David Adams /  Gábor Köves (quarterfinals)
 John-Laffnie de Jager /  David Ekerot (quarterfinals)

Draw

References
 1996 Campionati Internazionali di San Marino Doubles Draw

San Marino CEPU Open
1996 ATP Tour